Papa is a 2018 American drama film directed by Dan Israely and Emilio Roso. The film stars Robert Scott Wilson, Paul Sorvino, Daryl Hannah, Mischa Barton, Frankie Avalon, Ann-Margret, Michael Madsen and Eric Roberts. Filming took place in Bakersfield, California and Los Angeles in 2015.

Plot summary
A young man, Ben Freidman (Scott Wilson) raised by wealthy adoptive Jewish parents in Beverly Hills, decides that he is ready to finally meet his biological parents. He faces disappointment upon learning of the death of his biological mother. His biological father, meanwhile, resides in a psychiatric care unit.

Cast
 Robert Scott Wilson as Ben Freidman
 David Proval as David Dresner
 Paul Sorvino as Danny
 Daryl Hannah as Sarah Freidman
 Frankie Avalon as Jack Freidman
 Mischa Barton as Jennifer
 Ann-Margret as Barbara
 Vincent Pastore as Frankie Vincent
 Eric Roberts as Dr. Eric Owens
 Michael Madsen as Ivan
 Rachel Reilly as Tiffany
 Dar Zuzovsky as Sheila
 Rene Michelle Aranda as Robin

Several of the cast members have worked together on previous film projects. Daryl Hannah, Paul Sorvino and Eric Roberts all appear in Sicilian Vampire (2015). Hannah and Michael Madsen previously appeared alongside each other for their roles in Quentin Tarantino's Kill Bill: Vol. 1 (2003) and Kill Bill: Vol. 2 (2004). Papa also marks the third screen appearance that Mischa Barton and Eric Roberts have made together. They previously appeared together in Starcrossed (2014) and L.A. Slasher (2015).

References

External links
 
 

2018 films
2018 independent films
2018 drama films
American drama films
Films set in California
Films about adoption
2010s English-language films
2010s American films